Lists of members of the British House of Commons cover the members elected to the House of Commons of the United Kingdom.

By Parliament 

 1st (1801–1802)
 2nd (1802–1806)
 3rd (1806–1807)
 4th (1807–1812)
 5th (1812–1818)
 6th (1818–1820)
 7th (1820–1826)
 8th (1826–1830)
 9th (1830–1831)
 10th (1831–1832)
 11th (1832–1835)
 12th (1835–1837)
 13th (1837–1841)
 16th (1841–1847)
 15th (1847–1852)
 16th (1852–1857)
 17th (1857–1859)
 18th (1859–1865)
 19th (1865–1868)
 20th (1868–1874)
 21st (1874–1880)
 22nd (1880–1885)
 23rd (1885–1886)
 24th (1886–1892)
 25th (1892–1895)
 26th (1895–1900)
 27th (1900–1906)
 28th (1906–Jan. 1910)
 29th (1910)
 30th (Dec. 1910–1918)
 31st (1918–1922)
 32nd (1922–1923)
 33rd (1923–1924)
 34th (1924–1929)
 35th (1929–1931)
 36th (1931–1935)
 37th (1935–1945)
 38th (1945–1950)
 39th (1950–1951)
 40th (1951–1955)
 41st (1955–1959)
 42nd (1959–1964)
 43rd (1964–1966)
 44th (1966–1970)
 45th (1970–Feb. 1974)
 46th (1974)
 47th (Oct. 1974–1979)
 48th (1979–1983)
 49th (1983–1987)
 50th (1987–1992)
 51st (1992–1997)
 52nd (1997–2001)
 53rd (2001–2005)
 54th (2005–2010)
 55th (2010–2015)
 56th (2015–2017)
 57th (2017–2019)
 58th (2019–present)

See also 

 Lists of United Kingdom MPs by surname

Lists of United Kingdom MPs